RRLS Academy is a TESDA Accredited Institution, located at Iloilo City. It is a part of the John B. Lacson Foundation System and acts as a sister school, which caters on short-term Information and Communications Technology courses and technical education.

The school offers two year courses in computer programming and hardware servicing along with training in medical transcription and contact center services.

History
Opened on 10 February 2003 as the Information Technology Training Center (or the ITTC of the John B. Lacson Foundation System) the school began as a support department for John B. Lacson Colleges Foundation - Arevalo. It was transferred to John B. Lacson Foundation on 1 November 2006 and again transferred to John B. Lacson Foundation Maritime University - Molo on 1 June 2007.

Eventually, the ITTC was renamed as rrls ict academy, after Ronald Raymond Lacson Sebastian, the grandson of John B. Lacson, founder of the university. Currently, Mr. Sebastian is the chairman of the board for rrls ict academy, as well as the vice-chairman of Trustees for John B. Lacson Foundation Maritime University.

TESDA registered courses

Long lerm courses 
	* Computer Technology
	* Information Management

Short term courses (TESDA registered) 
	*Contact Center Services NC II
	*Computer Systems Servicing  NC II
	*Medical Transcription NC II
	*Housekeeping NC II (Guimaras Campus)

Institutional trainings (short term) 
	*Smart Office Training (Office Application and Basic Computer Operation)
	*Professional Web Development Application (Static and Dynamic Web Development)
	*Computer Aided Design and Drafting (AutoCAD 2D and 3D)
	*Technical Training (PC maintenance and troubleshooting)
	*Creative Design Training (Photoshop, Illustrator, Corel Draw)
	*Computer Programming

Institutional trainings
	Basic Computer Operations, 
	MS Word, MS Excel, 
	MS Powerpoint, 
	Adobe Photoshop, 
	AutoCAD 2D & AutoCAD 3D ( 20 hours each)

Scholarships
	PESFA and SEEDS Scholarship under JOLLIBEE and CHOWKING:
	· 2 – Year Computer Programming NC IV
	· 2 – Year Computer Hardware Servicing NC II

TRANSCOM Scholarship with job assistance:
	· Finishing Course for Call Center Agents NC II (100 hours)

Microsoft certification
	· Microsoft Word 2003 Expert     · Microsoft Excel 2003 Core
	· Microsoft Excel 2003 Expert     · Microsoft PowerPoint 2003 Core
	· Microsoft Word 2003 Core        · Microsoft Access 2003 Core

See also
Education in the Philippines

External links
Official website of RRLS Academy

References

Educational institutions established in 2003
Schools in Iloilo
2003 establishments in the Philippines